Catfish Mountain is a peak of the Kittatinny Mountains in Warren County, New Jersey, United States. The mountain stands  in height. It lies along the Appalachian Trail in the Delaware Water Gap National Recreation Area. Catfish Pond is to the southwest; it is drained by Yards Creek, which flows through Catfish Pond Gap.

References

External links
National Park Service: Delaware Water Gap National Recreation Area

Mountains of New Jersey
Kittatinny Mountains
Mountains of Warren County, New Jersey